is a retired Japanese featherweight freestyle wrestler. Between 1966 and 1968 he won all major titles, including gold medals at two world championships, and at the 1966 Asian and 1968 Olympic Games. He was inducted in the Wrestling Hall of Fame in 2007.

Life and career 
Kaneko was born in Ashikaga, Tochigi and started wrestling in high school. After graduating from Senshu University he joined the Japan Self-Defense Forces. He lost against Yojiro Uetake for the qualification to the 1964 Summer Olympics in bantamweight. He started weight training and changed weight classes to featherweight, eventually winning two world championships and the 1968 Summer Olympics. He was considered to be an "unusual" gold medalist, being 28 years old at the time, married, with a child. After retirement, he worked at the self-defense forces, and later became a secretary, and then a security director at Fuji Television.

References

1940 births
Living people
Olympic wrestlers of Japan
Wrestlers at the 1968 Summer Olympics
Japanese male sport wrestlers
Olympic gold medalists for Japan
Olympic medalists in wrestling
Asian Games medalists in wrestling
Wrestlers at the 1966 Asian Games
Japan Ground Self-Defense Force personnel
Medalists at the 1968 Summer Olympics
Asian Games gold medalists for Japan
Medalists at the 1966 Asian Games
World Wrestling Champions